Kennis Music is a record label, specializing in Afrobeats, R&B, pop and hip hop music, founded by Nigerian radio DJ Kenny Ogungbe in the late 1990s. The company's slogan is "Africa's No 1 Record Label". The current CEOs are Kehinde "Keke" Ogungbe and Dayo "D1" Adeneye.

Lemi Ghariokwu was the main album cover designer for the artists of Kennis music.

Current roster

Artistes
 Eedris Abdulkareem
 Joe EL
 Tizzy
 Deesuu

Former artistes
K.C. Presh
OJB Jezreel
Mike Aremu
Tony Tetuila
Bola Abimbola
Capital Femi
2face
BANTU
Goldie Harvey
Baba Dee
Sound Sultan
Kenny Saint Brown
Essence
Fiokee
Vip
Jaywon
Mzbel
Sir Shina Peters
eLDee
Oladele Delux
Don Akingb
Azadus

See also
 List of record labels

References

External links
Kennis Radio
  Kennis Music on Myspace
  Kennis Music On Facebook
  Kennis Music On Twitter

Nigerian record labels
Contemporary R&B record labels
Hip hop record labels
Pop record labels
1998 establishments in Nigeria
Record labels established in 1998